Chris Rice is an American singer and songwriter who works in the contemporary Christian music, contemporary folk, adult contemporary and adult album alternative genres. He became a recording artist in 1996 after signing a contract with Rocketown Records and releasing his debut album, Deep Enough to Dream. He released six albums between 1996 and 2007, before entering a 12-year hiatus. In 2019, he ended his hiatus and released a joint album with gospel artist Andrew Ripp.

Biography

Early years

Chris Rice, a native of Clinton, Maryland, grew up as the second of four sons born to bookstore owners. His parents, and other adult mentors, influenced Rice's Christian faith and his early work with youth and college students.

Having taken only three years of piano lessons as a child, Rice did not aspire to a career in either music or student work. But frequent invitations to speak and lead music at his church's youth group events led to more such invitations throughout his college years at the University of Maryland, Grace College in Winona Lake, Indiana, and Union University in Jackson, Tennessee. He holds a bachelor's degree in Psychology and Communication. While leading music and coaching high school soccer teams he began writing songs. What began as weekend and summer work with youth and college students soon turned into a full-time career during his twenties and thirties, and prompted Rice to write and perform mainly on the guitar.

For those two decades, Rice spent his time as an itinerant speaker and songwriter/musician, playing for high school and college conferences and camps nationwide. This schedule prepared Chris for his career as a signed recording artist, touring the country with a full band.

Career as a songwriter
Rice's songwriting career began in the mid-1980s, after moving from his Washington, D.C., home to Nashville, Tenn. During that period several of Rice's songs were recorded by other artists, including Kathy Troccoli and Terri Gibbs. Rice's "Welcome to Our World", an original Christmas song since recorded by Michael W. Smith, Amy Grant and John Tesh, moved Smith to urge his new label, Rocketown Records, to sign Rice as its first artist in 1996.

Solo artist
With the help of Monroe Jones' production skills, Chris Rice recorded Deep Enough to Dream for a September 1997 release. Past the Edges followed a year later. Rice's third album, Smell the Color 9, was issued in late 2000.

In 2001, Rice released two piano-only, instrumental releases, The Living Room Sessions and The Living Room Sessions: Christmas, recorded on Rice's own living room grand piano.

His sixth album, Run the Earth... Watch the Sky, released in March 2003, Chris again joined the production talents of his longtime friend and collaborator Monroe Jones. The album's first single was "The Other Side of the Radio".

These four studio releases (plus the two instrumental releases) fulfilled Rice's contractual commitment to Rocketown and they issued several compilation albums, Short Term Memories and Snapshots: Live and Fan Favorites, following his departure in June 2004 and February 2005 respectively.

New record label

Rice signed with independent label Eb+Flo Records, and made a marketing and distribution agreement with INO Records who had distribution through Sony/Columbia removed the limitation of catering his music to Christian radio formats.

His fifth studio album, Amusing, released in August 2005. For the first time in his career, Rice released radio singles to AC and Light Rock stations around the country, the first single being a light romantic song entitled "When Did You Fall (In Love With Me?)" which reached No. 8 on the Pop AC radio format and enjoyed Top Ten status throughout the middle of 2006. A second AC hit, "Lemonade", began climbing the AC chart in 2007.

With his success on the AC radio format, Rice released a side project hearkening back to his roots, a vocal hymns album, Peace Like a River: The Hymns Project, in November 2006.

Rice released What a Heart Is Beating For in July 2007, further positioning him as a pop artist. Only 2 of its 13 songs contained overt faith themes.

Other 

Since 2007, Rice has branched out in the visual arts, including photography and painting. In 2016, he self-published Widen, a book of poetry.

In December 2018, Rice and Andrew Ripp pre-released an album, Songs We Wrote on Tuesdays, as Ripp+Rice as well as a single "This Ain't No Love Song" from that album. The album, a mix of adult contemporary and country music and was officially released on January 4, 2019.

Sexual assault allegations 
On October 15, 2020, Relevant reported that a young man made allegations of sexual assault against Rice. He claimed that they had occurred several times between 1995 and 2003 when Rice led worship at retreats for the youth and college students of Tates Creek Presbyterian Church in Lexington, Kentucky. The church's statement made it clear that Rice was not an employee of the church, and that they are only allegations, but they were working with an outside organization, GRACE, "that investigates allegations of abuse in Christian institutions".
In June 2022, Tates Creek Presbyterian Church released GRACE's report which found the allegations to be credible.

Discography

Studio albums

EPs and other releases

Singles

Awards
 1998 – Nominated for six Dove Awards, including New Artist of the Year, Male Vocalist of the Year, Songwriter of the Year and Pop/Contemporary Album of the Year
 1999 – Dove Award winner for Male Vocalist of the Year and for participation in Special Event Album of the Year – Exodus
 2000 – Dove Award nominee for Recorded Music Packaging
 2002 – Dove Award nominee for Instrumental Album of the Year – Living Room Sessions: Hymns

References

External links
 
 Thought Quotient – Interview with Chris Rice
 CCMagazine.com's Live Chat Transcript with Chris
 
 
 Growthtrac Music article titled, "Chris Rice: Straight from the Heart"
 Christianity Today's June 2005 Interview with Chris
 Living the Solutions Music Review of Run the Earth...Watch the Sky

20th-century births
Living people
People from Clinton, Maryland
American children's musicians
American performers of Christian music
Singers from Maryland
Union University alumni
20th-century American singers
21st-century American singers
Year of birth missing (living people)